The C.B. Blethen Award honors the best journalist in the northwest United States. C. B. Blethen was publisher of The Seattle Times from 1915 until his death in 1941.

References

American journalism awards